The 10th Georgia Infantry Regiment was an infantry regiment that served in the Confederate States Army during the American Civil War. It participated in most of the key battles of Robert E. Lee's Army of Northern Virginia.

The regiment was raised in various counties throughout the state of Georgia and was mustered into Confederate service in June 1861 in Richmond, Virginia. It was initially assigned to Magruder's Peninsula Division. It served with the Army of Northern Virginia for the entire war, except during Longstreet's late 1863 expedition to Georgia and East Tennessee. The regiment was assigned to the Semmes-Bryan-Simms brigade.

Organization

Staff
Colonel
Lafayette McLaws (June 17, 1861, to September 25, 1861; Promoted to Brigadier General)
Alfred Cumming (September 25, 1861, to October 29, 1862; Promoted to Brigadier General)
John B. Weems (October 29, 1862, to May 19, 1864; Retired to the Invalid Corps)
Willis C. Holt (May 19, 1864, to October, 1864 - Willis C. Holt died from wounds that occurred Oct. 19 1864 suffered at Cedar Creek, VA)
Andrew J. McBride (March 2, 1865, to rank from February 20, 1865, to the end of the war)
Lieutenant Colonel
 Alfred Cumming (June, 1861 to September 25, 1861)
 John B. Weems (September 25, 1861, to October 29, 1862)
 Willis C. Holt (October 29, 1862, to May 19, 1864; Killed in action, Battle of Cedar Creek, Virginia)
 Charles C. Kibbee (Promoted for valor and skill on March 2, 1865, to date from February 20, 1865, to end of war)
Major
 John B. Weems (July 4, 1861, to September 25, 1861)
 R. R. Hawes (September 25, 1861, to August 4, 1862; Resigned due to disability)
 Willis C. Holt (August 4, 1862, to October 29, 1862)
 Philologus H. Loud (October 29, 1862, to February 13, 1865; Retired)

Companies
Company A - Confederate Sentinels (Muscogee County)
Company B - Letcher Guards (Richmond County) 
Company C - Chattahoochee Beauregards (Chattahoochee County)  
Company D - Independent Blues (Richmond County) 
Company E - Clayton Sharpshooters (Clayton County) 
Company F - Thomson Guards (Columbia County)  
Company G - (Pulaski County)
Company H - Wilcox County Rifles (Wilcox County) 
Company I - Fayette Grey Guards (Campbell and Fayette Counties)
Company K - Davis Musketeers (Richmond County) Corporal Gabriel Waters

Battles
 Back River [five companies] (July 24, 1861)
 Yorktown (April 1862)
 Lee's Mill (April 16, 1862)
 Williamsburg [skirmish] (May 4, 1862)
 Ellison's Mill, New Bridge, and Mechanicsville [skirmishes] [Companies C, E, and I] (May 23–24, 1862)
 Seven Days Battles (June 25-July 1, 1862)
 Savage's Station (June 29, 1862)
 Allen's Farm (July 1, 1862)
 Malvern Hill (July 1, 1862)
 South Mountain (September 14, 1862)
 Antietam (September 17, 1862)
 Fredericksburg (December 13, 1862)
 Chancellorsville (May 1–4, 1863)
 Gettysburg (July 1–3, 1863)
 Chickamauga [not engaged] (September 19–20, 1863)
 Chattanooga Siege (September–November 1863)
 Knoxville Siege (November–December 1863)
 The Wilderness (May 5–6, 1864)
 Spotsylvania Court House (May 8–21, 1864)
 North Anna (May 23–26, 1864)
 Cold Harbor (June 1–3, 1864)
 Petersburg Siege (June 1864-April 1865)
 Cedar Creek (October 19, 1864)
 Sayler's Creek (April 6, 1865)
 Appomattox Court House (April 9, 1865)

See also
List of Civil War regiments from Georgia

Units and formations of the Confederate States Army from Georgia (U.S. state)
Military units and formations established in 1861
Military units and formations disestablished in 1865
1861 establishments in Georgia (U.S. state)